Events in the year 1891 in Bulgaria.

Incumbents

Events 

 The Eagles' Bridge in Sofia was constructed by Czech architect Václav Prošek, his brother Jozef and his cousins Bohdan and Jiří.

References 

 
1890s in Bulgaria
Years of the 20th century in Bulgaria
Bulgaria
Bulgaria